Christian Detlev, Count von Reventlow (1671–1738) was a Danish military leader and diplomat.

Biography
He was the son of Conrad, Count Reventlow, chancellor of Denmark and his first wife Anna Margarethe Gabel (1651-1678). He was a brother of 
Christine Sophie Holstein (1672–1757) and a half-brother of Anne Sophie Reventlow (1693–1743), second wife and queen consort of King Frederick IV of Denmark. 

Reventlow had a military career and fought in the Danish contingent against the French during the War of the Grand Alliance. In 1701 he was sent at the head of the Danish troops to fight the French in Italy during  the War of Spanish Succession serving under Prince Eugene of Savoy (1663–1736). He took part in the Battle of Höchstädt in 1704 and he was severely wounded in the Battle of Cassano in 1705. At the Battle of Calcinato on 19 April 1706, Count von Reventlow was pitted against General Louis Joseph de Bourbon, duc de Vendôme (1654–1712) in a battle resulting in a French victory. His forces were divided as Reventlow was in command of the Imperial army at both Montichiari and Calcinato. 

In 1709 he held command of Danish forces in Scania during the Great Northern War. In March 1713 King Frederick IV appointed Reventlow as the top official (overpræsident)  of the city of Altona. Opposite Hamburg, the harbor of Altona was on the  banks of the Elbe river and at that time one of the  more important Danish harbour towns. The city had been plundered by  Swedish forces and had to be rebuilt. His task was to supervise the reconstruction program. In 1732 in the aftermath of the death of King Frederick IV of Denmark, he was dismissed from his position at Altona.

Personal life
Reventlow was first betrothed to Anna Christiane Gyldenløve (1676-1689) who died at 13 years of age. Anna Christiane was the daughter of 
daughter of King Christian V of Denmark and  Sophie Amalie Moth, Countess of Samsø. 

In 1700, he was married Benedikta Margarethe von Brockdorff (1678-1739). 
Among his children:
 Conrad Detlev (1704-1750) married in 1731 Wilhelmina Augusta (1704–1749), daughter of Prince Christian Charles of Schleswig-Holstein-Sonderburg-Plön-Norburg
 Christian Ditlev Reventlow (1710–1775), Danish Privy Councillor
 Christine Armgard von Reventlow (1711-1779), married Frederick Charles, Duke of Schleswig-Holstein-Sonderburg-Plön.

References

1671 births
1738 deaths
Danish army commanders in the War of the Spanish Succession
18th-century Danish diplomats
Christian Detlev
Generals of the Holy Roman Empire